Minos Kalokairinos (Μίνως Καλοκαιρινός, 1843, Heraklion - 1907, Heraklion) was a Cretan Greek businessman and amateur archaeologist.

He was the first person to undertake excavations of the ancient site of Knossos, and the first to identify the location of the palace of the rulers during the Minoan period, which is popularly known as the Knossian Labyrinth. His excavations were later continued by Arthur Evans.

Biography 
He was the youngest of the sons of Andreas Kalokairinos, a rich landowner, who owned, in particular, the site of the Cnossian palace. He obtained secondary education on the isle of Syros, then enrolled at the law faculty of the university of Athens where he only studied for a year, as his father's illness forced him to return to Heraklion. After his father died, he and his brother Lysimachos Kalokairinos took over his soap manufacturing business.

In 1869 he married Skevo Kyriazi, with whom he had five children.  In 1895 his company went bankrupt.

In 1903 he resumed his legal studies.

Excavations 
The initial excavation began in 1877 on the Kephala Hill, followed by full-scale excavations in 1878 which revealed  the first hard evidence that Knossos (or Cnossos), the centre of the Minoan civilization, was there, attracting worldwide interest.

The Turkish authorities who controlled the island forced him to stop excavations three weeks later, but he managed to discover storage rooms and a corner part of the throne hall of the west wing of the palace.

News of his excavations awoke interest among many archaeologists, including W.J. Stillman, Heinrich Schlieman and finally Sir Arthur John Evans, who was able to excavate the whole palace after the island gained independence from Turkey.

Collection 
Minos Kalokairinos had a large collection of objects found during his excavations. During the violent events of August 25, 1898, when the Turks tried to suppress the Cretan revolt, his home was pillaged and burnt, and his collection was heavily damaged; only the rarest objects, which were kept separately, survived. They were mostly amphoras found in the western wing of the palace, which he later donated to museums of Greece, Paris and London to promote public interest in Cnossos.

References

External links 
 Site of the city of Heraklion
 Site of the archaeological museum of Heraklion

1907 deaths
1843 births
Minoan archaeologists
Greek archaeologists
Businesspeople from Heraklion
Pages with unreviewed translations